William Alford (born October 30, 1981) is a former American football defensive back for the Jacksonville Sharks of the Arena Football League (AFL). Alford played college football at Vanderbilt University.

External links 
 Alford's NFL.com profile

1981 births
Living people
Vanderbilt Commodores football players
Baltimore Ravens players
Nashville Kats players
Frankfurt Galaxy players
Denver Broncos players
Jacksonville Sharks players